HNLMS Banckert may refer to following ships of the Royal Netherlands Navy:

 , an 
 , previously HMS Quilliam, acquired in 1945 and scrapped in 1957
 , a 

Royal Netherlands Navy ship names